MacInnis is a surname. Notable people with the surname include:

Ai Hua (born Charlotte MacInnis in 1981), American television presenter active in China
Al MacInnis (born 1963), Canadian hockey defenseman
Alison MacInnis (born 1980), American actress
Angus MacInnis (1884–1964), Canadian politician
Donald MacInnis (1918–2007), Canadian politician
Gordon MacInnis (born 1945), Canadian businessman and politician
Grace MacInnis ,  (1905–1991), Canadian politician and feminist
Joseph B. MacInnis  (born 1937), Canadian explorer, the first scientist to dive under the North Pole
Malcolm MacInnis (born 1933), Canadian politician
William H. MacInnis (1861-?), American politician
David Macinnis Gill, American author

See also
MacInnis Lake, a lake of Cape Breton Regional Municipality, Nova Scotia, Canada
McInnes
MacInnes